Line 6 of the Chengdu Metro is a rapid transit line in Chengdu. It starts at Wangcong Temple and ends at Lanjiagou.

Line 6's color is brown. The line began construction in 2016 and was opened on 18 December 2020. Line 6 uses high capacity 8-car Type A trains.  Line 6 became the longest stretch of subway to be opened at once in China and as of 2020, Line 6 is currently the  longest continious subway tunnel in the world.

Progress 

 2017-03-01, the first tunnel boring machine was launched. 42 TBMs will be used simultaneously for the construction of the line.

 2019-10-07, tunnel construction completed for Line 6.

 2020-05-27, as Phase 3 section of Line 6 finishes track-laying, other Phase 1 and 2 sections officially started testing rolling stock.

 2020-07-01, the last section of Line 6, between Xihua Avenue station and Dongguang station, is powered on, paving the way for dynamic testing.

 2020-12-18, Line 6 officially opened.

Stations

See also
 Chengdu Metro
 Chengdu
 Urban rail transit in China

References

Chengdu Metro lines
Railway lines opened in 2020